The 1992–93 St. Louis Blues season witnessed the Blues finish fourth in the Norris Division with a record of 37 wins, 36 losses and 11 ties for 85 points. In the playoffs, they pulled off a shocking upset of the division champion Chicago Blackhawks in the Norris Division Semifinals. However, their run ended in the Norris Division Finals, which they lost in seven games to the Toronto Maple Leafs.

The Blues endured a coaching change early in the season, when head coach Bob Plager resigned after only 11 games. He was replaced by assistant general manager Bob Berry.

Offseason
Forward Brett Hull is named team captain, replacing defenceman Garth Butcher.

NHL draft

Regular season

The Blues finished with the best penalty kill in the league (83.68%), allowing only 70 goals in 429 short-handed situations.

Final standings

Schedule and results

Playoffs

Western Conference Quarterfinals vs. Chicago Blackhawks (1)

Clarance Campbell Conference Division Finals vs. Toronto Maple Leafs (3)

Player statistics

Forwards
Note: GP= Games played; G= Goals; A= Assists; Pts = Points; PIM = Penalties in minutes

Defensemen
Note: GP= Games played; G= Goals; A= Assists; Pts = Points; PIM = Penalties in minutes

Goaltending
Note: GP= Games played; W= Wins; L= Losses; T = Ties; SO = Shutouts; GAA = Goals Against Average

References
 Blues on Hockey Database

St.
St.
St. Louis Blues seasons
St
St